The (Roman Catholic) Diocese of Hakha is located in the Chin State and the Sagaing Division in northwestern Myanmar. It is a suffragan diocese of the archdiocese of Mandalay.

The diocese was created on November 21, 1992 by splitting off the territory from the archdiocese of Mandalay.

The diocese covers an area of 27,516  km². It is subdivided into 31 parishes. 31,624 of the 485,247 people in the area belong to the Catholic Church, 76% of the population belong to the Protestant church.

List of bishops
 Nicholas Mang Thang, (November 21, 1992 - November 30, 2011)
 Lucius Hre Kung, (appointed bishop 19 October 2013)

External links
 Catholic-hierarchy.org

Roman Catholic dioceses in Burma
Christian organizations established in 1992
Roman Catholic dioceses and prelatures established in the 20th century